The Santana 25 is an American trailerable sailboat that was designed by W. Shad Turner as an International Offshore Rule Quarter Ton class racer and first built in 1973. The boat was Turner's first design.

Production
The design was built by W. D. Schock Corp in the United States, from 1973 to 1977 but it is now out of production.

Design
The Santana 25 is a recreational keelboat, built predominantly of fiberglass, with wood trim. It has a masthead sloop rig, a raked stem, a reverse transom, a transom-hung rudder controlled by a tiller and a fixed fin keel or swing keel. The fixed keel model displaces  and carries  of ballast, while the swing keel model displaces  and carries  of ballast. The swing keel model also has less sail area.

The boat is normally fitted with a small  outboard motor for docking and maneuvering.

The design has sleeping accommodation for four people, with a double "V"-berth in the bow cabin and two straight settees in the main cabin along with a swing table. The galley is located on both sides at the companionway ladder. The head is located just aft of the bow cabin on the starboard side.

Variants
Santana 25-1
This model was introduced in 1973 and produced until 1977 with 160 boats completed. It has a cast iron keel.
Santana 25-2
This model was introduced in 1973. It has a revised cabin top and deck design, plus a lead keel.

Operational history
The boat is supported by an active class club that organizes racing events, the Quarter Ton Class.

See also
List of sailing boat types

References

External links
Photo of a Santana 25-1
Photo of a Santana 25-2

Keelboats
1970s sailboat type designs
Sailing yachts
Trailer sailers
Sailboat type designs by W. Shad Turner
Sailboat types built by W. D. Schock Corp